Mastacăn may refer to several villages in Romania:

 Mastacăn, a village in Borlești Commune, Neamț County
 Mastacăn, a village in Dragomirești Commune, Neamț County